In the mathematical field of graph theory, the Heawood graph is an undirected graph with 14 vertices and 21 edges, named after Percy John Heawood.

Combinatorial properties
The graph is cubic, and all cycles in the graph have six or more edges. Every smaller cubic graph has shorter cycles, so this graph is the 6-cage, the smallest cubic graph of girth 6. It is a distance-transitive graph (see the Foster census) and therefore distance regular.

There are 24 perfect matchings in the Heawood graph; for each matching, the set of edges not in the matching forms a Hamiltonian cycle. For instance, the figure shows the vertices of the graph placed on a cycle, with the internal diagonals of the cycle forming a matching. By subdividing the cycle edges into two matchings, we can partition the Heawood graph into three perfect matchings (that is, 3-color its edges) in eight different ways. Every two perfect matchings, and every two Hamiltonian cycles, can be transformed into each other by a symmetry of the graph.

There are 28 six-vertex cycles in the Heawood graph. Each 6-cycle is disjoint from exactly three other 6-cycles; among these three 6-cycles, each one is the symmetric difference of the other two. The graph with one node per 6-cycle, and one edge for each disjoint pair of 6-cycles, is the Coxeter graph.

Geometric and topological properties
The Heawood graph is a toroidal graph; that is, it can be embedded without crossings onto a torus. One embedding of this type places its vertices and edges into three-dimensional Euclidean space as the set of vertices and edges of a nonconvex polyhedron with the topology of a torus, the Szilassi polyhedron.

The graph is named after Percy John Heawood, who in 1890 proved that in every subdivision of the torus into polygons, the polygonal regions can be colored by at most seven colors. The Heawood graph forms a subdivision of the torus with seven mutually adjacent regions, showing that this bound is tight.

The Heawood graph is the Levi graph of the Fano plane, the graph representing incidences between points and lines in that geometry. With this interpretation, the 6-cycles in the Heawood graph correspond to triangles in the Fano plane. Also, the Heawood graph is the Tits building of the group SL3(F2).

The Heawood graph has crossing number 3, and is the smallest cubic graph with that crossing number . Including the Heawood graph, there are 8 distinct graphs of order 14 with crossing number 3.

The Heawood graph is the smallest cubic graph with Colin de Verdière graph invariant μ = 6. 

The Heawood graph is a unit distance graph: it can be embedded in the plane such that adjacent vertices are exactly at distance one apart, with no two vertices embedded to the same point and no vertex embedded into a point within an edge.

Algebraic properties
The automorphism group of the Heawood graph is isomorphic to the projective linear group PGL2(7), a group of order 336. It acts transitively on the vertices, on the edges and on the arcs of the graph. Therefore, the Heawood graph is a symmetric graph. It has automorphisms that take any vertex to any other vertex and any edge to any other edge. 
More strongly, the Heawood graph is 4-arc-transitive.
According to the Foster census, the Heawood graph, referenced as F014A, is the only cubic symmetric graph on 14 vertices.

It has book thickness 3 and queue number 2.

It is the only graph with this characteristic polynomial, making it a graph determined by its spectrum.

Gallery

References 

Individual graphs
Regular graphs